John Mitchinson is the head of research for the British television panel game QI, and is also the managing director of Quite Interesting Limited. He is co-writer of the QI series of books with the show's creator John Lloyd. The two men are normally referred to as "The Two Johns" and are seen as the main controllers of QI, as they do most of the research of the show. His most recent work, 1,411 Quite Interesting Facts to Knock You Sideways, a collaboration with John Lloyd and James Harkin, was released in 2015 with W.W. Norton and Company.

He is cofounder of Unbound, and along with Andy Miller presents Unbound's literature podcast Backlisted ("giving new life to old books").

QI

Mitchinson acted as an associate producer for the first series. For several years Mitchinson was also director of the "QI Club", which was situated at 16 Turl Street, Oxford. Under his management the building consisted of a bookshop, a café-bar and a vodka bar, as well as a number of rooms devoted to use by the private members club.

QI books
After the success of the QI TV series, Mitchinson co-authored, with QI's creator John Lloyd, the QI Annuals for 2008 and 2009, as well the main QI books, these being The Book of General Ignorance, The Book of Animal Ignorance, Advanced Banter: The QI Book of Quotations, and The QI Book of the Dead.

Publishing background

For the ten years before QI, Mitchinson was a book publisher, running the Harvill Press, Cassell & Co and acting as Deputy Publisher of the Orion Group, now the UK’s third largest publisher. Prior to that he spent six years as Marketing Director of Waterstone’s the booksellers. He is a Vice-President of the Hay Festival, a director of Jonathan Burrows contemporary dance group, a Fellow of the RSA and one of Trustees of the London Centre for International Storytelling.

Personal life

Mitchinson lives in the Oxfordshire village of Great Tew, where his spare time spent with his wife and children, raising pigs, chickens, and sheep.

References

External links

QI website The People Behind QI
"Questions for: John Mitchinson", BookBrunch, 29 June 2021

Alumni of Merton College, Oxford
British writers
Living people
Year of birth missing (living people)